Ameche is a surname. Notable people with the surname include:

Alan Ameche (1933–1988), American football player 
Don Ameche (1908–1993), American actor and voice artist
Jim Ameche (1915–1983),  American radio actors
Steven Ameche, American lawyer

See also 
Ameche's Drive-in, fast-food restaurant chain based in Baltimore, Maryland